Fire, Water, and Trumpets  (Ogon', voda i... mednye truby) is a 1968 Soviet fantasy film directed by Aleksandr Rou. Its story and characters are derived from Slavic folklore.

Plot
There exists a Russian idiom, "to go through  fire, water and trumpets" (пройти огонь, воду и медные трубы) meaning approximately "to go to hell and back"; in other words, to persevere in the face of extreme adversity.

The young collier Vasya goes into the forest to collect firewood. In a clearing he spies the lovely Alyonushka grazing her goat Byelochka. As soon as he has fallen in love with the girl, werewolves appear and kidnap her to deliver to the wicked Koshchei. To rescue his beloved, Vasya must go through a literal version of the titular proverb: first he must pass through the kingdoms of fire and water, then contend with the more challenging "trumpets", that is, to resist the temptation of fame and flattery.

Cast
 Natalya Sedykh — Alyonushka
 Aleksei Katyshev — Vasya
 Georgy Millyar — Koshchei, Baba Yaga
 Vera Altayskaya — daughter of Baba Yaga
 Koshchei's werewolves:
 Lev Potyomkin — Blackbeard
 Alexander Khvylya — Baldy
 Anatoly Kubatsky — Cyclops
 Leonid Kharitonov — Fedul VI
 Muza Krepkogorskaya — Sofyushka
 Aleksei Smirnov — Head firefighter
 Pavel Pavlenko — Vodyanoy
 Arkady Tsinman — Adviser
 Zoya Vasilkova — Adviser
 Mikhail Pugovkin — Tsar
 Lidiya Korolyova — Tsarina
 Inga Budkevich — Princess

References

External links
 

1968 films
Russian children's fantasy films
Soviet fantasy films
Films based on Russian folklore
Films based on Slavic mythology
Films directed by Aleksandr Rou
Films based on fairy tales
Soviet children's films